Rampersaud is a surname. Notable people with the surname include:

Mario Rampersaud (born 1992), Barbadian cricketer 
Raj Rampersaud, Canadian orthopedic surgeon

See also
Rampersad